Margaret Throckmorton later Magdelan (religious name) (1591 – 26 October 1668) was an English prioress of St Monica's convent in Leuven. It was one of seven religious communities on the continent of English nuns escaping discrimination in England.

Life
Throckmorton was born in Coughton Court in 1591. She was one of the nine children of Agnes (born Wilford) and John Throckmorton. Her father died when she was about five.

She professed as an Augustine choir nun on 5 August 1613.

She became the prioress of St Monica in Leuven and her family assisted the community financially. Her election was not unanimous and she was initially elected for just three years. However her reign was extended in 1636 and commemorated with a painting. She was eventually appointed for life in 1639. St Monica's was one of seven religious communities on the continent at the time of English nuns escaping discrimination in England. Until 1640 St Monica's employed the musician John Boult as their organist and chaplain. Boult had been a musician for Queen Elizabeth and had been with Throckmorton when she professed in 1613.

She kept the convent solvent by only taking in women who wanted to be nuns if they could bring a good dowry. She had to ride out the plague and in 1636 Leuven was placed under a siege. Throckmorton arranged for half of the nuns to temporarily leave the convent.

Mary Thimbleby, a notable letter-writer, was unanimously voted in as the new Prioress after Margaret Throckmorton died in Leuven on 26 October 1668. There were 36 nuns at that time.

References

1591 births
1668 deaths
English Roman Catholics
People from Warwickshire
Nuns of the Spanish Netherlands
Clergy from Leuven